Roy Judicaël Kayara (born 2 May 1990) is a New Caledonian footballer who plays as a defender for Hienghène Sport. He is a member of the New Caledonia national football team.

Before the beginning of the 2013–14 season, Kayara was on trial with Sheffield United during their tour of Scotland. He made appearances against Cowdenbeath, Greenock Morton and Raith Rovers.

International goals
As of matches played 21 March 2019. New Caledonia score listed first, score column indicates score after each Kayara goal.

References

1990 births
Living people
New Caledonian footballers
New Caledonia international footballers
People from North Province, New Caledonia
Association football midfielders
AS Magenta players
Hienghène Sport players
2012 OFC Nations Cup players
2016 OFC Nations Cup players
Expatriate association footballers in New Zealand
New Caledonian expatriate sportspeople in New Zealand